The Motor City Open was a PGA Tour event played at various clubs in and around Detroit for just under two decades. The PGA Tour record for the longest sudden-death playoff was established at the 1949 Motor City Open. Cary Middlecoff and Lloyd Mangrum played 11 holes at Meadowbrook Country Club in Northville, Michigan and were still stalemated when darkness arrived. Tournament officials, with their mutual consent, declared them co-winners.

In 1955, the Motor City Open was originally to be played at Meadowbrook Country Club.  This was abandoned however, when Meadowbrook CC professional, Chick Harbert, won the PGA Championship in 1954.  Meadowbrook petitioned for and won the opportunity to host the 1955 PGA Championship.  Due to this development, the Motor City Open was not held in 1955.  This is the only time that a defending champion of a major championship has hosted the tournament the following year.

In 2019 the Rocket Mortgage Classic at Detroit Golf Club in the city of Detroit replaced The National in the Washington, DC metropolitan area.

Tournament hosts
1948, 1949, 1954, 1959 Meadowbrook Country Club (Northville, Michigan)
1950, 1952 Red Run Golf Club (Royal Oak, Michigan)
1956 Western Golf and Country Club (Redford, Michigan)
1962 Knollwood Country Club (West Bloomfield, Michigan)

Winners

Notes

References

Former PGA Tour events
Golf in Michigan
Recurring sporting events established in 1948
Recurring sporting events disestablished in 1962
1948 establishments in Michigan
1962 disestablishments in Michigan